Ekhon is a Bangladeshi Bengali-language satellite and cable business-related infotainment television channel owned by Spice Television Limited, a subsidiary of the City Group, one of Bangladesh's largest conglomerates.

It is Bangladesh's first television channel dedicated to business and financial programming. Ekhon is based in Tikatuli, Dhaka. It is also a sister channel to Somoy TV, which is also owned by City Group.

History

Licensing and test broadcasts 
Ekhon was licensed as "Spice Television" by the Bangladesh Telecommunication Regulatory Commission in 2017. It commenced experimental broadcasts via the Bangabandhu-1 satellite on 30 July 2021 using the Spice Television name, after it signed an agreement with BSCL on 28 July of that year to use the satellite for broadcasting. The channel later commenced the 'Nirman Porbo' test broadcast on 16 December 2021, coinciding the Bangladeshi victory day. On 30 May 2022, Ekhon signed a corporate agreement with state-owned telecommunications company TeleTalk, which would provide various services to the television channel at an affordable price.

Launch 
Although originally planning to do so on 16 December 2021, the channel was officially launched using the "Ekhon" name on 9 June 2022, as the first television channel in Bangladesh to air business-related programming and the thirty-seventh television channel overall to be launched in the country.

Programming 
The programming line of Ekhon consists of shows and news relating to finance and the economy. However, it also focuses on sports, agriculture, climate, and more.

List of programming 
 Apnar Shongey
 Ekhon Anondo
 Ekhon Mathe

References

External links 
 Ekhon on Facebook
 Ekhon on Twitter
 Ekhon on YouTube

Television in Bangladesh
Television channels in Bangladesh
2022 establishments in Bangladesh
Television channels and stations established in 2022
Business-related television channels